Darvish Kandi (also Romanized as Darvīsh Kandī; also known as  Mokhtār Kandī, Nāyebar Kandī, and Nāyeb Kandī) is a village in Qaleh Darrehsi Rural District, in the Central District of Maku County, West Azerbaijan Province, Iran. At the 2006 census, its population was 125, in 20 families.

References 

Populated places in Maku County